Nello Sbaiz (8 May 1941 – 28 November 2022) was an Italian football player and manager who played as a defender.

Biography
Sbaiz played for AS Saint-Étienne from 1957 to 1967. He then joined FC Lorient. He played 150 matches in Division 1 and 80 matches in Division 2. He played two matches in the European Cup and one match in the UEFA Cup Winners' Cup.

Honours
Saint-Étienne
 French Division 1: 1964, 1967
 French Division 2: 1963
 Coupe de France: 1962
 Challenge of Champions:

References

1941 births
2022 deaths
Italian footballers
Association football defenders
Ligue 1 players
Ligue 2 players
AS Saint-Étienne players
FC Lorient players
Italian football managers
FC Lorient managers
Italian sports directors
Italian expatriate footballers
Italian expatriate sportspeople in France
Expatriate footballers in France
People from the Province of Udine